A window well is a recess in the ground around a building to allow for installment of bigger windows in a basement either below ground or partially below ground. By making it possible to put in a larger window, the window can act as a safer emergency exit in case of fire as well as letting in additional daylight for the enjoyment of the people inside. Such a (basement) window where people can escape through in case of an emergency is sometimes called an egress window.

Minimum window sizes may be required by building code (particularly for bed and living rooms) due to fire safety, which often makes it necessary to install window wells. Window wells are sometimes covered by a window well cover to avoid snow and debris to enter the pit, as well as preventing fall injuries into the window well.

Care should be taken to install window wells correctly to ensure proper drainage and avoid leaks.

See also 
 Alcove (architecture)
 Niche (architecture)

References 

Windows
Architectural elements